Antonín Brabec (born 2 June 1973 in Prague) is a former Czech rugby union player and the current rugby coach. He is nicknamed "Tony". His position on the field is on the centre or the fly half.

Early career
Brabec was born on 2 June 1973 in Prague. He began playing rugby union in his hometown at the age of six for RC Tatra Smíchov. He played as a back.
His father Antonín is former player, coach and president Tatra Smíchov.

Rugby career

Rugby League
He played two matches for Czech Republic rugby league national team. 
8.6 2006 - ČR XIII vs Pioneers BUSRL 8:29
12.8 2006 - ČR XIII vs Serbia 26:38 (Try Brabec)

Player honours

Personal accolades
Czech Rugby Player of the Year: - 1995

Club accolades

RC Tatra Smíchov
 Czech Republic XV Champion - 1995, 1997, 2003, 2007
 Czech Republic XV Cup - 1995, 1997, 2003, 2007
 Czech Republic 7s Champion - 2007

RC Mountfield Říčany
 Czech Republic Champion XV - 2011, 2012

RC Sparta Praha
 Czech Republic 7s Champion - 2014

Coaching career

Club

National team

Coaching honours

Personal accolades
Czech Rugby Coach of the Year: - 2010, 2011

Club accolades

RC Tatra Smíchov
 Czech Republic 7s Champion - 2007

RC Mountfiled Říčany
 Czech Republic XV Champion - 2011, 2012

RC Sparta Praha
 Czech Republic Champion 7s - 2014

See also
 Rugby union in the Czech Republic
 Česká Rugbyová Unie
 Czech Republic national rugby team
 Czech Republic national rugby sevens team
 Czech Republic national rugby league team
 RC Tatra Smíchov
 RC Říčany

External links
   Czech Rugby Union 
   RC Říčany 
   RC Tatra Smíchov 
 Ranking of Czech rugby player of the year

References
 26.8 2016 - Brabec is back in RC Mountfield Říčany
 2.11 2015 - Brabec: We're late behind Georgia and Romania minimum 15 years
 20.8. 2013 - Rugby coach Brabec will coach RC Sparta Praha
 13.6 2008 - Brabec leaving RC Tatra Smíchov. He will be a new coach RC Říčany

Czech rugby union coaches
Czech rugby union players
1973 births
Living people
Sportspeople from Prague